Řepov is a municipality and village in Mladá Boleslav District in the Central Bohemian Region of the Czech Republic. It has about 700 inhabitants.

History
Řepov was founded in 1787.

References

Villages in Mladá Boleslav District